Sir Harry Platt, 1st Baronet, FRCS, KStJ (7 October 1886 – 20 December 1986) was an English orthopaedic surgeon, president of the Royal College of Surgeons of England (1954–1957). He was a founder of the British Orthopaedic Association, of which he became president in 1934–1935.

Life
He was born in Thornham, Royton, Lancashire, the son of Ernest Platt, a velvet cutter and later chairman of United Velvet Cutters, Ltd. Harry developed a tuberculous knee as a child and his early education was at home. He entered the Victoria University of Manchester to study medicine and qualified in 1909 from both Victoria and London Universities. After resident and registrar appointments he demonstrated anatomy at Manchester Royal Infirmary. His orthopaedic training was mainly at the Royal National Orthopaedic Hospital in London, and in Boston, USA. On his return to England in 1914, he was appointed surgeon at Ancoats Hospital but on the outbreak of World War I he was appointed to be surgeon-in-charge of a military orthopaedic centre in Manchester as a captain in the Royal Army Medical Corps.

By 1932, his posts included being senior honorary surgeon and surgeon-in-charge of the orthopaedic service, Ancoats Hospital, as consulting orthopaedic surgeon for Lancashire County Council and in 1939 he advanced on his earlier status as a clinical lecturer in orthopaedic surgery at the University of Manchester when he was appointed professor. He became a Knight Bachelor in 1948. He delivered the Bradshaw Lecture to the Royal College of surgeons in 1950 on the subject of bone sarcomas.

He was elected to the Council of the Royal College of surgeons in 1940, serving there for eighteen years, and was elected  vice-president in 1949–1950 and president 1954–1957, being made a baronet on completing his term as president. He was appointed a Knight of the Most Venerable Order of the Hospital of St. John of Jerusalem (KStJ) in February 1972.

In 1959 he produced the Platt Report, which encouraged hospitals to permit parents to visit and care for their children in hospital much more than had previously been allowed. This was the result of a three-year enquiry by a committee set up to investigate the welfare of children in hospital, as opposed to their medical needs. Before this time parental visiting was commonly limited to just a couple of hours a week.

He died in 1986 at age of 100.

Platt had been much influenced by the work of Robert Jones in Liverpool and by his training in the US. He continued to be inspired by US methods for medical training and organisation. Among those whom he influenced in turn was John Charnley.

See also
Platt baronets

References

External resources
Harry Platt Papers at the University of Manchester Library

1886 births
1986 deaths
People from Royton
Alumni of the University of Manchester
Fellows of the Royal College of Surgeons
Baronets in the Baronetage of the United Kingdom
British orthopaedic surgeons
Academics of the University of Manchester
English centenarians
Men centenarians
Presidents of the Royal Society of Medicine
Knights Bachelor
Physicians of the Manchester Royal Infirmary
20th-century surgeons